Ainsworth Field is a 3,000 seat baseball stadium located in Erie, Pennsylvania.  It hosted the Erie Sailors and other Erie-based minor league teams between 1928 and 1994.  In 1995, it was made obsolete for professional use by the opening of UPMC Park.  It was refurbished in 2004 and is currently used for high school and other amateur baseball games.

History
In 1914, the ballpark opened under the name Athletic Field. The name was changed on August 25, 1947, to honor James "Doc" Ainsworth, a longtime adviser of Erie's youth. Babe Ruth, along with Ruth's All-Stars visited the ballpark in 1923 to play an exhibition game against the Erie Moose Club. Ruth's All-Stars won 15-1. Ruth had played first base. He had two singles and committed two errors. He also had a home run. There are many myths about where his home run ball landed. Some say it cleared past the adjacent Roosevelt Middle School, while others believe it entered the school's smoke stack.

See also

References

2. Erie Dispatch-Herald, 4/23/1914, pg. 8, "Eight Report at Start of Hi Track Practice." Microfilm Erie County Public Library.

External links
 BallparkReviews.com Photos and Review

Minor league baseball venues
Sports venues in Pennsylvania
Sports in Erie, Pennsylvania
Parks in Erie, Pennsylvania